Čermáňsky FK Nitra is a Slovak football team, based in the town of Nitra. The club was founded in 1945.

Events timeline 
 1945 – Founded as Dynamo Čermáň
 1970 – Renamed Strojár Nitra
 2003 – Renamed ČFK Nitra

References

External links 
Official website 

Football clubs in Slovakia
CFK
Association football clubs established in 1945
1945 establishments in Slovakia